South Bay (previously South Bay Center) is a shopping center in the Dorchester neighborhood of Boston, Massachusetts. It is located off I-93, US 1, Route 3, near the transition from the Southeast Expressway to the Central Artery traveling through Downtown Boston.

Begun as a strip-mall shopping center in 1998, it was proposed in 2015 that a major expansion of South Bay would result in construction of several six-story buildings containing up to 500 apartments, 200 hotel rooms, a cinema, and stores.  Public officials from Dorchester said in 2015 they looked forward to a thorough community review of the plans and that the project appeared to present an exciting opportunity for the neighborhood.  However, Councilor Frank Baker had significant concerns for neighbors regarding managing traffic around the expanded complex.

History

South Bay began as a suburban-style strip mall, with South Carolina-based Edens, the developer, having bought the center in 1998 and expanded it eight years later. In 2015, Edens announced plans for implementation of a new, urban street grid, pedestrian orientation, mixed land uses, structured parking, and acute attention to the details of dynamic public space.

The project called for 475 apartments, a 130-room hotel, 12-screen cinema, 113,000 square feet of retail and restaurant space, and parking, plotted on a 9.9-acre residential and commercial development.

The project encompasses 10 parcels on Allstate Road, West Howell and Enterprise streets, and Baker and Field courts — formerly largely vacant, commercial/industrial land and parking lots south of South Bay Center. Existing buildings on the site include the closed Kam Man food market, a closed two-story office building, a vacant shipping and loading facility, and the Aggregate Concrete plant. South Bay Center and its surrounding developments collectively encompass the neighborhood of South Bay, within Dorchester, Boston.

Completed in 2020, South Bay's Andi apartment complex is surrounded by luxury condominium complexes on Willow Court, Baker Court, Field Court, and Enterprise Streets. According to Boston Business Journal, Willow Baker LLC is proposing three residential buildings, spanning a combined 208,470 square feet, including neighborhood retail, commercial office space, and parking. “The Proponent envisions revitalizing and converting the combined Project Site into a mixed-use development that enhances its immediate area, with new widened sidewalks, public realm and open space, pedestrian and vehicular access, and underground utility upgrades for the immediate area,” attorney Joseph P. Hanley wrote in a Jan. 22, 2020, letter of intent. Willow Baker LLC has acquired rights to develop on 1.3 acres of property, comprising 13 parcels “of underutilized and distressed properties” along Willow, Baker and Fields Court, near the intersection of Allstate Road and Massachusetts Avenue, within South Bay.

Surrounding area

The area surrounding the shopping center has experienced gentrification since development begin in 2015. Large development contributes to a more advanced stage of gentrification.  While some sentiment has been positive about this change, high prices for property in the South Bay neighborhood will make it harder for owners of commercial and industrial uses to resist selling out.  South Bay continues to be a stop for developers looking to attract downtown workers, according to local real estate specialists.

In 2015, Boston had 706 violent crimes per 100,000 people, a rate that is much lower than cities with comparable populations, according to police statistics that had been reported to the FBI.  The persistent crime in some of Boston’s neighborhoods, including Dorchester, appears to correlate with a host of socio-economic factors. In Dorchester, where poverty remains entrenched in some sections, the unemployment rate has historically been higher than in the rest of the city.

References

External links 
 

Dorchester, Boston
Shopping malls in Massachusetts
Shopping malls established in 1994